Hugo Descat (born 16 August 1992) is a French handball player for Montpellier Handball and the French national team. 

Descat was the second best scorer in the 2016–17 season of the Championnat de France, third in 2013, fourth in 2012 and fifth in 2015. He was also the second best scorer of the 2011 Youth World Championship.

International honours
Junior World Championship: 
Bronze Medalist: 2013

Individual awards
 All-Star Left Wing at the 2020 Olympics
 All-Star Left Wing of the Youth World Championship: 2011
 Championnat de France Best Young Player Award: 2012

References

External links
 Profile at LNH Division 1

French male handball players
Handball players from Paris
Living people
1992 births
Expatriate handball players
French expatriate sportspeople in Romania
CS Dinamo București (men's handball) players
Handball players at the 2010 Summer Youth Olympics
Handball players at the 2020 Summer Olympics
Medalists at the 2020 Summer Olympics
Olympic gold medalists for France
Olympic medalists in handball